McGuire Branch is a stream in Clinton County in the U.S. state of Missouri.

McGuire Branch has the name of Silas McGuire, an early citizen.

See also
List of rivers of Missouri

References

Rivers of Clinton County, Missouri
Rivers of Missouri